Pocket Books is a division of Simon & Schuster that primarily publishes paperback books.

History 
Pocket Books produced the first mass-market, pocket-sized paperback books in the United States in early 1939 and revolutionized the publishing industry. The German Albatross Books had pioneered the idea of a line of color-coded paperback editions in 1931 under Kurt Enoch, and Penguin Books in Britain had refined the idea in 1935 and had one million books in print by the following year.

Pocket Books was founded by Richard L. Simon, M. Lincoln ("Max") Schuster and Leon Shimkin, partners of Simon & Schuster, along with Robert de Graff.

Penguin's success inspired entrepreneur Robert de Graff, who partnered with publishers Simon & Schuster to bring it to the American market. Priced at 25 cents and featuring the logo of Gertrude the kangaroo (named after the mother-in-law of the artist, Frank Lieberman), Pocket Books' editorial policy of reprints of light literature, popular non-fiction, and mysteries was coordinated with its strategy of selling books outside the traditional distribution channels. The small format size, 4.25" by 6.5" (10.8 cm by 16.5 cm) and the fact that the books were glued rather than stitched, were cost-cutting innovations.

The first ten numbered Pocket Book titles published in May 1939 with a print run of about 10,000 copies each:
 Lost Horizon by James Hilton
 Wake Up and Live by Dorothea Brande
 Five Great Tragedies by William Shakespeare
 Topper by Thorne Smith
 The Murder of Roger Ackroyd by Agatha Christie
 Enough Rope by Dorothy Parker
 Wuthering Heights by Emily Brontë
 The Way of All Flesh by Samuel Butler
 The Bridge of San Luis Rey by Thornton Wilder
 Bambi by Felix Salten

This list includes seven novels, the most recent being six years old (Lost Horizons, 1933), two classics (Shakespeare and Wuthering Heights, both out of copyright), one mystery novel, one book of poetry (Enough Rope), and one self-help book.

The edition of Wuthering Heights hit the bestseller list, and by the end of the first year Pocket Books had sold more than 1.5 million units. Robert de Graff continued to refine his selections with movie tie-ins and greater emphasis on mystery novels, particularly those of Christie and Erle Stanley Gardner.

Pocket and its imitators thrived during World War II because material shortages worked to their advantage. During the war, Pocket sued Avon Books for copyright infringement: among other issues, a New York state court found Pocket did not have an exclusive right to the pocket-sized format (both Pocket and Avon published paperback editions of Leslie Charteris' The Saint mystery series, among others).

In 1944, the founding owners sold the company to Marshall Field III, owner of the Chicago Sun newspaper. Following Field's death in 1957, Leon Shimkin, a Simon & Schuster partner, and James M. Jacobson bought Pocket Books for $5 million. Simon & Schuster acquired Pocket in 1966.

Phyllis E. Grann who would later become the first woman CEO of a major publishing firm was promoted to run Pocket Books under then CEO Richard E. Snyder. Grann left for Putnam in 1976.

In 1981, Dr. Benjamin Spock's Baby and Child Care was listed as their top seller, having sold 28 million copies at that time and having been acquired in 1946.

In 1989, The Dieter by Susan Sussman became the first hardcover published by Pocket Books.

Pocket was for many years known for publishing works of popular fiction based on movies or TV series, such as the Star Trek franchise (owned by corporate siblings CBS Television Studios and Paramount Pictures). Since first obtaining the Star Trek license from Bantam Books in 1979 (with a publication of the novelization of Star Trek: The Motion Picture), Pocket has published hundreds of original and adapted works based upon the franchise and continues to publish a new novel every month. Beginning in 2017 with novels based on Star Trek: Discovery, the Star Trek novel lines have gradually moved to Simon & Schuster's Gallery Books line.

Pocket also previously published novels based on Buffy the Vampire Slayer. The author credited for one of the Buffy products is Gertrude Pocket, a reference to the company's kangaroo logo. (The Buffy novels are now published by Simon Spotlight Entertainment, another division of Simon & Schuster.) Pocket Books is also the division that currently owns publication rights to the well-known work of James O'Barr, The Crow.

Imprints
 Baen Books—science fiction and fantasy (distributed), including the Honor Harrington series
 Cardinal Edition
 Downtown Press—chick lit
 Gallery Books
 G-Unit Books 
 Juno Books—formerly an imprint of Wildside Press
 MTV/VH1 Books
 Permabooks
 Pocket Star Books—media tie in
 Pocket Star eBooks
 Threshold Editions—conservative titles
 WWE Books

Defunct imprints
 Sonnet—romance
 Timescape—science fiction
 Wanderer Books

References

External links
"Paperback Publishers" (archived version).
Finding aid to Thomas L. Bonn papers at Columbia University. Rare Book & Manuscript Library.

 01
Simon & Schuster
Book publishing company imprints
Book publishing companies based in New York City
Publishing companies based in New York City
American companies established in 1939
Publishing companies established in 1939
1939 establishments in New York City